Mohamed Ahmed is an Egyptian paralympic powerlifter. He competed at the 2016 Summer Paralympics in the powerlifting competition, winning the silver medal in the men's 107 kg event.

References

External links 
Paralympic Games profile

Living people
Place of birth missing (living people)
Year of birth missing (living people)
Egyptian powerlifters
Powerlifters at the 2016 Summer Paralympics
Medalists at the 2016 Summer Paralympics
Powerlifters at the 2020 Summer Paralympics
Paralympic medalists in powerlifting
Paralympic silver medalists for Egypt
21st-century Egyptian people